Mandy Wilkinson (born 1970, Manchester) is a British painter.

She graduated from Cumbria College of Art and Design with a first class degree in 1994. Predominantly an abstract painter whose individual paintings cross the boundaries between the two-dimensional and the three-dimensional, gestural painterliness and flat monochrome blocks of colour.

In August 2009 her dealer, David Godfrey, claimed she was the most copied living artist. Both Wilkinson and Godfrey, the curator of Central London's Gallery 94, said mass production art studios in China had made her a favourite and reproduced countless numbers of her works which had returned to the market as 'originals'. Wilkinson sells her paintings for £2,000 to £6,000 while the Chinese copies were selling for £45.

Reading the article of The Independent, published September 3, 2009, Mrs. Wilkinson notes that she never placed a signature on the front of one of her paintings. This reference may help to identify the originality of a canvas.

Wilkinson lives in near Llangollen, North Wales.

References

External links
Gallery at 94
Mandy Wilkinson on AxisWeb
Article in The Independent 3 September 2009

1970 births
Living people
20th-century English women artists
21st-century English women artists
Abstract painters
Artists from Manchester
English women painters